The 1977 Kilkenny Senior Hurling Championship was the 83rd staging of the Kilkenny Senior Hurling Championship since its establishment by the Kilkenny County Board.

James Stephens were the defending champions.

Fenians won the championship after a 3-11 to 1-10 defeat of Rower-Inistioge in the final. It was their fifth championship title overall and their first title in three championship seasons. It remains their last championship triumph.

References

Kilkenny Senior Hurling Championship
Kilkenny Senior Hurling Championship